David Abiker (born 11 February 1969 in Suresnes, France) is a French radio and television journalist. He graduated from Sciences Po.

References

External links 
  Official website

1969 births
Living people
People from Suresnes
20th-century French Jews
French radio journalists
French television journalists
Sciences Po alumni